Nigilgia seyrigella is a moth in the family Brachodidae. It was described by Viette in 1954. It is found in Madagascar.

The larvae feed on Ficus species.

References

Natural History Museum Lepidoptera generic names catalog

Brachodidae
Moths described in 1954